Hangnyeoul Station is a station on the Seoul Subway Line 3 in Gangnam-gu, Seoul. The only exit of this station is connected to SETEC (Seoul Trade Exhibition & Convention Center). This station has the least ridership of all Line 3 stations in Seoul.

It is located in Daechi-dong, Gangnam-gu, Seoul.

Station layout

Vicinity
 Exit 1 : Seoul Trade Exhibition Center

References 

Seoul Metropolitan Subway stations
Metro stations in Gangnam District
Railway stations opened in 1993
Seoul Subway Line 3